Chelsea Marshall (born August 14, 1986, in Randolph, Vermont) is an American alpine ski racer who has competed since 2002. Her best World Cup finish was eighth in a downhill event in Italy in 2008.

Marshall finished 27th in the downhill event at the FIS Alpine World Ski Championships 2009 in Val d'Isère.

She was named to the US Olympic team for the 2010 Winter Olympics in late 2009.

External links
 
 
 

1986 births
Alpine skiers at the 2010 Winter Olympics
American female alpine skiers
Living people
Olympic alpine skiers of the United States
Sportspeople from Vermont
21st-century American women